Agathis may refer to:
Agathis, a genus of evergreen trees
Agathis (wasp), a genus of braconid wasps